The 1981 Texas Tech Red Raiders football team represented Texas Tech University as a member of the Southwest Conference (SWC) during the 1981 NCAA Division I-A football season. In their first season under head coach Jerry Moore, the Red Raiders compiled a 1–9–1 record (4–5 against SWC opponents), were outscored by a combined total of 298 to 198, and finished in ninth and last place in the conference.  The team played its home games at Clifford B. and Audrey Jones Stadium in Lubbock, Texas.

Schedule

References

Texas Tech
Texas Tech Red Raiders football seasons
Texas Tech Red Raiders football